Archepandemis coniferana is a species of moth of the family Tortricidae first described by Akira Mutuura in 1978. It is found in North America, where it has been recorded from Alberta, British Columbia and California. The habitat consists of coniferous forests.

The wingspan is over 17.5 mm. The ground colour of the forewings is white with dark grey bands with an irregular black border. The hindwings are dark grey. Adults have been recorded on wing from mid to late July.

Larvae have been reared from Pinus contorta, Pseudotsuga menziesii, Juniperus species, Picea engelmannii and Tsuga heterophylla.

References

Archipini
Moths described in 1978
Moths of North America
Taxa named by Akira Mutuura